Brasiliocrotonis is a monotypic plant genus in the family Euphorbiaceae. The sole species is Brasiliocrotonis mamoninha. The plant was first described in 2005 from lowland forests in eastern and northeastern Brazil, whence its name.

References

Crotoneae
Monotypic Euphorbiaceae genera
Flora of Brazil